Serving You is the fourth studio album by Hong Kong English pop, Cantopop singer Janice Vidal, released on 27 November 2008 under the record label Amusic in Hong Kong. Among the notable features of the album, the track 陰天假期 is a cover of Japanese singer Yuna Ito's Endless Story.

Track listing 
 就算世界無童話 "Even If the World's No Fairy Tale"
 "My Cookie Can"
 陰天假期 "Cloudy Holidays"
 雜技 "Acrobatics"
 你知道我在等你們分手嗎? "You Know I'm Waiting for You to Break up?"
 如水 "Water"
 愛深過做人 "Love Deeper Than Life"
 我愛呼吸 "I Love Breathing"
 比我想像中愛你 "Love You More Than I Imagined"
 寒命 "Cold Life"
 退 "Retreat"
 主角愛我 "Protagonist Love You"
 "Reality"
 無所謂 "Doesn't Matter"

External links 
 A music
 [ All-Music Guide]

2008 albums
Janice Vidal albums